"Does Your Mother Know" is a song by Swedish pop group ABBA and was the second single taken from their sixth album, Voulez-Vous. The B-side was "Kisses of Fire", which was also taken from the album. The song is notable for its emphasis on male vocals, performed by Björn Ulvaeus, with female backing vocals.

"Does Your Mother Know" was recorded in February 1979 and released as a single in April of that year. Written by Benny Andersson and Ulvaeus, the demo for "Does Your Mother Know" featured Ulvaeus on guide vocal and it was decided to keep this during the recording process. The track was debuted on the Eurovision networked BBC TV Special ABBA In Switzerland broadcast across the continent in April 1979 when the group performed a slightly different version of the track partially live during the show, with a much longer instrumental introduction from the recorded version.

In 2019, the single was re-released on picture disc.

Reception
"Does Your Mother Know" was another sizeable ABBA hit, hitting No. 1 in Belgium and reaching the top 5 in Great Britain, Ireland, the Netherlands and Finland. It was also a top 10 hit in Australia, Canada, West Germany, Rhodesia and Switzerland. As of September 2021, it is ABBA's 14th-biggest song in the UK, including both pure sales and digital streams.

AllMusic reviewer Donald A. Guarisco said in a review of the song that "ABBA's recording balances the song's rock elements with dance music touches to create an intriguing dance/rock hybrid" and that its "macho feel is enhanced by a rockabilly-styled melody that flowers into a swinging chorus".  Billboard felt the song sounds like those from the musical Grease, saying that "the sweet, airy vocals contrast effectively with the rocking instrumentation."  Cash Box said that it is a "rocking departure for the group, although the overall sound is still Europop." Record World said that "this buoyant pop-rocker is destined to become a classic."

The song was featured heavily in the 2003 film Johnny English, starring Rowan Atkinson.

Charts

Weekly charts

Year-end charts

Certifications and sales

ABBA version

Mamma Mia! version

References

External links
 Lyrics of this song
 

1979 songs
1979 singles
ABBA songs
European Hot 100 Singles number-one singles
Music videos directed by Lasse Hallström
Atlantic Records singles
Epic Records singles
Polar Music singles
Songs written by Benny Andersson and Björn Ulvaeus